|}

The Tandridge Stakes is a Listed flat horse race in Great Britain open to horses aged four years or older. It is run over a distance of 1 mile and 1 yard at Lingfield Park in February. Prior to 2023 the race was named the Winter Derby Trial and run over 1 mile and 2 furlongs. First run in 1999, it was run as an ungraded conditions race prior to 2007. The race was reduced in distance to 1 mile and renamed the Tandridge Stakes from the 2023 running.

The race served as a trial for the Winter Derby, a Group 3 race run over the same course & distance 21 days later. From 2000, five horses won both races - Zanay (2000), Adiemus (2002), Eccentric (2005), Grendisar (2016), and Wissahickon (2019).

Records

Most successful horse (2 wins):
 Grand Passion – 2004, 2006
 Grendisar - 2015, 2016
 Bangkok - 2020, 2021

Leading jockey (3 wins):
 Kieren Fallon – Parasol (2003), Grand Passion (2004), Gitano Hernando (2010)

Leading trainer (5 wins):
 Marco Botti – Re Barolo (2009), Gitano Hernando (2010), Planteur (2013), Grendisar (2015, 2016)

Winners

See also 
Horse racing in Great Britain
List of British flat horse races

References 

Racing Post:

Open middle distance horse races
Lingfield Park Racecourse
Flat races in Great Britain
Recurring sporting events established in 1999
1999 establishments in England